A barrister is a type of lawyer in common law jurisdictions. Barristers mostly specialise in courtroom advocacy and litigation. Their tasks include taking cases in superior courts and tribunals, drafting legal pleadings, researching the law and giving expert legal opinions.

Barristers are distinguished from both solicitors and chartered legal executives, who have more direct access to clients, and may do transactional legal work. It is mainly barristers who are appointed as judges, and they are rarely hired by clients directly. In some legal systems, including those of Scotland, South Africa, Scandinavia, Pakistan, India, Bangladesh, and the British Crown dependencies of Jersey, Guernsey and the Isle of Man, the word barrister is also regarded as an honorific title.

In a few jurisdictions, barristers are usually forbidden from "conducting" litigation, and can only act on the instructions of a solicitor, and increasingly - chartered legal executives, who perform tasks such as corresponding with parties and the court, and drafting court documents. In England and Wales, barristers may seek authorisation from the Bar Standards Board to conduct litigation. This allows a barrister to practise in a "dual capacity", fulfilling the role of both barrister and solicitor.

In some common law jurisdictions, such as New Zealand, Canada and some Australian states and territories, lawyers are entitled to practise both as barristers and solicitors, but it remains a separate system of qualification to practise exclusively as a barrister. In others, such as the United States, the barrister, solicitor and chartered legal executive distinction does not exist at all.

Differences between barristers and other lawyers

Differences

A barrister, who can be considered a jurist, is a lawyer who represents a litigant as an advocate before a court of appropriate jurisdiction. A barrister speaks in court and presents the case before a judge or jury. In some jurisdictions, a barrister receives additional training in evidence law, ethics, and court practice and procedure. In contrast, a solicitor or chartered legal executive generally meets with clients, does preparatory and administrative work and provides legal advice. In this role, they may draft and review legal documents, interact with the client as necessary, prepare evidence, and generally manage the day-to-day administration of a lawsuit. In England and Wales, solicitors, and to some, yet steadily increasing degree, chartered legal executives, can provide a crucial support role to a barrister when in court, such as managing large volumes of documents in the case or even negotiating a settlement outside the courtroom while the trial continues inside.

There are other essential differences. A barrister will usually have rights of audience in the higher courts, whereas other legal professionals will often have more limited access, or will need to acquire additional qualifications to have such access. As in common law countries in which there is a split between the roles of barrister and solicitor, the barrister in civil law jurisdictions is responsible for appearing in trials or pleading cases before the courts.

Barristers usually have particular knowledge of case law, precedent, and the skills to "build" a case. When a solicitor or chartered legal executive in, respectively, general and specific practice is confronted with an unusual point of law, they may seek the "opinion of counsel" on the issue.

In most countries, barristers operate as sole practitioners and are prohibited from forming partnerships or from working as a barrister as part of a corporation. (In 2009, the Clemens Report recommended the abolition of this restriction in England and Wales.) However, barristers normally band together into barristers' chambers to share clerks (administrators) and operating expenses. Some chambers grow to be large and sophisticated and have a distinctly corporate feel. In some jurisdictions, they may be employed by firms of solicitors and chartered legal executives, banks, or corporations as in-house legal advisers.

In contrast, solicitors, chartered legal executives and attorneys work directly with the clients and are responsible for engaging a barrister with the appropriate expertise for the case. Barristers generally have little or no direct contact with their "lay clients", particularly without the presence or involvement of the solicitor and/or chartered legal executive. All correspondence, inquiries, invoices, and so on, will be addressed to the solicitor or to the chartered legal executive, who is primarily responsible for the barrister's fees.

In court, barristers are often visibly distinguished from solicitors and other legal practitioners by their apparel. For example, in Ireland, England, and Wales, a barrister usually wears a horsehair wig, stiff collar, bands, and a gown. Since January 2008, solicitor advocates have also been entitled to wear wigs, but wear different gowns.

In many countries the traditional divisions between barristers and solicitors and other legal representatives are breaking down. Barristers once enjoyed a monopoly on appearances before the higher courts, but in Great Britain this has now been abolished, and solicitor advocates and Rights of Audience conferred - chartered legal executives can generally appear for clients at trial. Increasingly, firms of solicitors and their rapidly emerging and increasingly recognised counterparts - the chartered legal executives, are keeping even the most advanced advisory and litigation work in-house for economic and client relationship reasons. Similarly, the prohibition on barristers taking instructions directly from the public has also been widely abolished. But, in practice, direct instruction is still a rarity in most jurisdictions, partly because barristers with narrow specializations, or who are only really trained for advocacy, are not prepared to provide general advice to members of the public.

Historically, barristers have had a major role in trial preparation, including drafting pleadings and reviewing evidence. In some areas of law, that is still the case. In other areas, it is relatively common for the barrister to receive the brief from the instructing solicitor to represent a client at trial only a day or two before the proceeding. Part of the reason for this is cost. A barrister is entitled to a "brief fee" when a brief is delivered, and this represents the bulk of his or her fee in relation to any trial. They are then usually entitled to a "refresher" for each day of the trial after the first, but if a case is settled before the trial, the barrister is not needed and the brief fee would be wasted. Some solicitors avoid this by delaying delivery of the brief until it is certain the case will go to trial.

Justification for a split profession
Some benefits of maintaining the split include:
 Having an independent barrister reviewing a course of action gives the client a fresh and independent opinion from an expert in the field distinct from solicitors who may maintain ongoing and long-term relationships with the client.
 In many jurisdictions, judges are appointed from the bar (members of the profession of barrister within a given jurisdiction). Since barristers do not have long-term client relationships and are further removed from clients than solicitors, judicial appointees are more independent. 
 Having recourse to all of the specialist barristers at the bar can enable smaller firms, who could not maintain large specialist departments, to compete with larger firms.
 A barrister acts as a check on the solicitor conducting the trial; if it becomes apparent that the claim or defense has not been properly conducted by the solicitor prior to trial, the barrister can (and usually has a duty to) advise the client of a separate possible claim against the solicitor.
 Expertise in conducting trials, owing to the fact that barristers are specialist advocates. 
 In many jurisdictions, barristers must follow the cab-rank rule, which obliges them to accept a brief if it is in their area of expertise and if they are available, facilitating access to justice for the unpopular.

Some disadvantages of the split include:
 A multiplicity of legal advisers can lead to less efficiency and higher costs, a concern to Sir David Clemens in his review of the English legal profession.
 Because they are further removed from the client, barristers can be less familiar with the client's needs.

A detailed examination of the justifications for a split legal profession and of the arguments in favor of a fused profession can be found in English solicitor Peter Reeve's 1986 book, Are Two Legal Professions Necessary?

Regulation

Barristers are regulated by the Bar for the jurisdiction where they practise, and in some countries, by the Inn of Court to which they belong. In some countries, there is external regulation.

Inns of Court, where they exist, regulate admission to the profession. Inns of Court are independent societies that are titularly responsible for the training, admission (calling), and discipline of barristers. Where they exist, a person may only be called to the Bar by an Inn, of which they must first be a member. In fact, historically, call to and success at the Bar, to a large degree, depended upon social connections made early in life.

A Bar collectively describes all members of the profession of barrister within a given jurisdiction. While as a minimum the Bar is an association embracing all its members, it is usually the case, either de facto or de jure, that the Bar is invested with regulatory powers over the manner in which barristers practise.

Barristers around the world
In the common law tradition, the respective roles of a lawyer – that is as legal adviser and advocate – were formally split into two separate, regulated sub-professions, the other being the office of solicitor. Historically, the distinction was absolute, but in the modern legal age, some countries that had a split legal profession now have a fused profession – anyone entitled to practise as a barrister may also practise as a solicitor, and vice versa; and alternatively – as a chartered legal executive. 
In practice, the distinction may be non-existent, minor, or marked, depending on the jurisdiction. In some jurisdictions, such as Australia, Scotland and Ireland, there is little overlap.

Australia

In the Australian states of New South Wales, Victoria and Queensland, there is a split profession. Nevertheless, subject to conditions, barristers can accept direct access work from clients. Each state Bar Association regulates the profession and essentially has the functions of the English Inns of Court. In the states of South Australia and Western Australia, as well as the Australian Capital Territory, the professions of barrister and solicitor are fused, but an independent bar nonetheless exists, regulated by the Legal Practice Board of the state or territory. In Tasmania and the Northern Territory, the profession is fused, although a very small number of practitioners operate as an independent bar.

Generally, counsel dress in the traditional English manner (wig, gown, bar jacket and jabot) before superior courts, although this is not usually done for interlocutory applications. Wigs and robes are still worn in the Supreme Court and the District Court in civil matters and are dependent on the judicial officer's attire. Robes and wigs are worn in all criminal cases. In Western Australia, wigs are no longer worn in any court.

Each year, the Bar Association appoints certain barristers of seniority and eminence to the rank of "Senior Counsel" (in most States and Territories) or "King's Counsel" (in the Northern Territory, Queensland, Victoria and South Australia). Such barristers carry the title "SC" or "KC" after their name. The appointments are made after a process of consultation with members of the profession and the judiciary. Senior Counsel appear in particularly complex or difficult cases. They make up about 14 per cent of the bar in New South Wales.

Bangladesh
In Bangladesh, the law relating to the Barristers is the Bangladesh Legal Practitioners and Bar Council Order, 1972 (President Order No. 46) as amended which is administered and enforced by the Bangladesh Bar Council. Bangladesh Bar Council is the supreme statutory body to regulate the legal professions in Bangladesh and ensure educational standard and regulatory compliance by the Advocates on roll of the Bar Council. The Bar Council, with the help of government, prescribes rules to regulate the profession. All law graduates educating from home or abroad have to write and pass the Bar Council Examination to be enrolled and admitted as professional Advocates to practise law both as Barristers & Solicitors. The newly enrolled advocates are permitted to start practice in the lower (District) courts after admitting as members of the local (District) Bar Associations. After two years of Practice in lower court, the Advocates are eligible to be enrolled in the High Court Division of the Supreme Court of Bangladesh. By passing the Bar Council Examination, the advocates are issued with certificates of enrollment and permission in prescribed form to practise in the High Court Division of the Supreme Court also. Only those advocates who became Barristers in the U.K. maintain their honorific title of barristers. In Bangladesh, there is an association called Barristers' Association of Bangladesh that represents the such U.K. bases barristers.[10]

Canada
In Canada (except Quebec), the professions of barrister and solicitor are fused, and many lawyers refer to themselves with both names, even if they do not practise in both areas. In colloquial parlance within the Canadian legal profession, lawyers often term themselves as "litigators" (or "barristers"), or as "solicitors", depending on the nature of their law practice though some may in effect practise as both litigators and solicitors. However, "litigators" would generally perform all litigation functions traditionally performed by barristers and solicitors; in contrast, those terming themselves "solicitors" would generally limit themselves to legal work not involving practice before the courts (not even in a preparatory manner as performed by solicitors in England), though some might practise before chambers judges. As is the practice in many other Commonwealth jurisdictions such as Australia, Canadian litigators are "gowned", but without a wig, when appearing before courts of "superior jurisdiction". All law graduates from Canadian law schools, and holders of NCA certificates of Qualification (Internationally trained lawyers or graduates from other law schools in common-law jurisdictions outside Canada) from the Federation of Law Societies of Canada after can apply to the relevant Provincial regulating body (law society) for admission (note here that the Canadian Provinces are technically each considered different legal jurisdictions). Prerequisites to admission as a member to a law society involve the completion of a Canadian law degree (or completion of exams to recognize a foreign common law degree), a year of articling as a student supervised by a qualified lawyer, and passing the bar exams mandated by the province the student has applied for a licence in. Once these requirements are complete then the articling student may be "called to the bar" after the review if their application and consideration of any "good character" issues at which they are presented to the Court in a call ceremony. The applicant then becomes a member of the law society as a "barrister and solicitor".

The situation is somewhat different in Quebec as a result of its civil law tradition. The profession of solicitor, or avoué, never took hold in colonial Quebec, so attorneys (avocats) have traditionally been a fused profession, arguing and preparing cases in contentious matters, whereas Quebec's other type of lawyer, civil-law notaries (notaires), handle out-of-court non-contentious matters. However, a number of areas of non-contentious private law are not monopolized by notaries so that attorneys often specialise in handling either trials, cases, advising, or non-trial matters. The only disadvantage is that attorneys cannot draw up public instruments that have the same force of law as notarial acts. Most large law firms in Quebec offer the full range of legal services of law firms in common-law provinces. Intending Quebec attorneys must earn a bachelor's degree in civil law, pass the provincial bar examination, and successfully complete a legal internship to be admitted to practice. Attorneys are regulated by the Quebec Law Society (Barreau du Québec).

France
In France, avocats, or attorneys, were, until the 20th century, the equivalent of barristers. The profession included several grades ranked by seniority: avocat-stagiaire (trainee, who was already qualified but needed to complete two years (or more, depending on the period) of training alongside seasoned lawyers), avocat, and avocat honoraire (senior barrister). Since the 14th century and during the course of the 19th and 20th in particular, French barristers competed in territorial battles over respective areas of legal practice against the conseil juridique (legal advisor, transactional solicitor) and avoué (procedural solicitor), and expanded to become the generalist legal practitioner, with the notable exception of notaires (notaries), who are ministry appointed lawyers (with a separate qualification) and who retain exclusivity over conveyancing and probate. After the 1971 and 1990 legal reforms, the avocat was fused with the avoué and the conseil juridique, making the avocat (or, if female, avocate) an all-purpose lawyer for matters of contentious jurisdiction, analogous to an American attorney. French attorneys usually do not (although it they are entitled to) act both as litigators (trial lawyers) and legal consultants (advising lawyers), known respectively as avocat plaidant and avocat-conseil. This distinction is however purely informal and does not correspond to any difference in qualification or admission to the roll. All intending attorneys must pass an examination to be able to enrol in one of the Centre régional de formation à la profession d'avocat (CRFPA) (Regional centre for the training of lawyers). The CRFPA course has a duration of two years and is a mix between classroom teachings and internships. Its culmination is the stage final (final training), where the intending attorney spends six months in a law firm (generally in their favoured field of practice and in a firm in which they hope to be recruited afterwards). The intending attorney then needs to pass the Certificat d'Aptitude à la Profession d'Avocat (CAPA), which is the last professional examination allowing them to join a court's bar (barreau). It is generally recognised that the first examination is much more difficult than the CAPA and is dreaded by most law students. Each bar is regulated by a Bar Council (Ordre du barreau).

A separate body of barristers exists called the avocats au Conseil d'Etat et à la Cour de Cassation. Although their legal background, training and status is the same as the all-purpose avocats, these have a monopoly over litigation taken to the supreme courts, in civil, criminal or administrative matters.

Germany
In Germany, no distinction between barristers and solicitors is made. Lawyers may plead at all courts except the civil branch of the Federal Court of Justice (Bundesgerichtshof), to which fewer than fifty lawyers are admitted. Those lawyers, who deal almost exclusively with litigation, may not plead at other courts and are usually instructed by a lawyer who represented the client in the lower courts. However, these restrictions do not apply to criminal cases, nor to pleadings at courts of the other court systems, including labour, administrative, taxation, and social courts and the European Union court system.

Hong Kong

The legal profession in Hong Kong is also divided into two branches: barristers and solicitors.

In the High Court (including both the Court of First Instance and the Court of Appeal) and the Court of Final Appeal, as a general rule, only barristers and solicitor-advocates are allowed to speak on behalf of any party in open court. This means that solicitors are restricted from doing so. In these two courts, save for hearings in chambers, barristers dress in the traditional English manner, as do the judges and other lawyers.

In Hong Kong, the rank of King's Counsel was granted prior to the handover of Hong Kong from the United Kingdom to China in 1997. After the handover, the rank has been replaced by Senior Counsel post-nominal letters: SC. Senior Counsel may still, however, style themselves as silks, like their British counterparts.

India

In India, the law relating to the barrister is the Advocates Act, 1961 introduced and conceived by Ashoke Kumar Sen, the then-law minister of India, which is a law passed by the Parliament and is administered and enforced by the Bar Council of India. Under the act, the Bar Council of India is the supreme regulatory body for the legal profession in India, ensuring the compliance of the laws and maintenance of professional standards by the legal profession in the country. For this purpose, the Bar Council of India is authorized to pass regulations and make orders in individual cases and also generally.

Each state has a Bar Council of its own whose function is to enroll the barristers willing to practise predominantly within the territorial confines of that state and to perform the functions of the Bar Council of India within the territory assigned to them. Therefore, each law degree holder must be enrolled with a (single) State Bar Council to practise in India. However, enrollment with any State Bar Council does not restrict the Barrister from appearing before any court in India, even though it is beyond the territorial jurisdiction of the State Bar Council which they are enrolled in.

The advantage with having the State Bar Councils is that the workload of the Bar Council of India can be divided into these various State Bar Councils and also that matters can be dealt with locally and in an expedited manner. However, for all practical and legal purposes, the Bar Council of India retains with it, the final power to take decisions in any and all matters related to the legal profession on the whole or with respect to any 

The process for being entitled to practise in India is twofold. First, the applicant must be a holder of a law degree from a recognized institution in India (or from one of the four recognised Universities in the United Kingdom) and second, must pass the enrollment qualifications of the Bar Council of the state where they seek to be enrolled. For this purpose, the Bar Council of India has an internal Committee whose function is to supervise and examine the various institutions conferring law degrees and to grant recognition to these institutions once they meet the required standards. In this manner the Bar Council of India also ensures the standard of education required for practising in India is met with. As regards the qualification for enrollment with the State Bar Council, while the actual formalities may vary from one State to another, yet predominately they ensure that the application has not been a bankrupt /criminal and is generally fit to practise before courts of India.
Enrollment with a Bar Council also means that the law degree holder is recognized as a Barrister and is required to maintain a standards of conduct and professional demeanor at all times, both on and off the profession. The Bar Council of India also prescribes "Rules of Conduct" to be observed by the Barristers in the courts, while interacting with clients and even otherwise.

Ireland

In the Republic of Ireland, admission to the Bar by the Chief Justice of Ireland is restricted to those on whom a Barrister-at-Law degree (BL) has first been conferred. The Honorable Society of King's Inns is the only educational establishment which runs vocational courses for barristers in the Republic and degrees of Barrister-at-Law can only be conferred by King's Inns. King's Inns are also the only body with the capacity to call individuals to the bar and to disbar them.

Most Irish barristers choose to be governed thereafter by the Bar of Ireland, a quasi-private entity. Senior members of the profession may be selected for elevation to the Inner Bar, when they may describe themselves as Senior Counsel ("SC"). All barristers who have not been called to the Inner Bar are known as Junior Counsel (and are identified by the postnominal initials "BL"), regardless of age or experience. Admission to the Inner Bar is made by declaration before the Supreme Court, patents of precedence having been granted by the Government. Irish barristers are sole practitioners and may not form chambers or partnerships if they wish to remain members of the Bar of Ireland's Law Library.

To practise under the Bar of Ireland's rules, a newly-qualified barrister is apprenticed to an experienced barrister of at least seven years' experience. This apprenticeship is known as pupillage or devilling. Devilling is compulsory for those barristers who wish to be members of the Law Library and lasts for one legal year. It is common to devil for a second year in a less formal arrangement but this is not compulsory. Devils are not generally paid for their work in their devilling year.

Israel
In Israel, there is no distinction between barristers and solicitors, notwithstanding the judicial system in Israel is based mostly on English common law, as a continuation of the British Mandate in Palestine. Practically, there are lawyers in Israel who do not appear in courts, and their work is similar to a solicitor's.

Japan
Japan adopts a unified system. However, there are certain classes of qualified professionals who are allowed to practise in certain limited areas of law, such as scriveners (shiho shoshi, qualified to handle title registration, deposit, and certain petite court proceedings with additional certification), tax accountants (zeirishi, qualified to prepare tax returns, provide advice on tax computation and represent a client in administrative tax appeals) and patent agents ("benrishi", qualified to practise patent registration and represent a client in administrative patent appeals). Only the lawyers (bengoshi) can appear before the court and are qualified to practise in any areas of law, including, but not limited to, areas that those qualified law-related professionals above are allowed to practise. Most attorneys still focus primarily on court practice and still a very small number of attorneys give sophisticated and expert legal advice on a day-to-day basis to large corporations.

Netherlands
The Netherlands used to have a semi-separated legal profession comprising the lawyer and the procureur, the latter resembling, to some extent, the profession of barrister. Under that system, lawyers were entitled to represent their clients in law, but were only able to file cases before the court at which they were registered. Cases falling under the jurisdiction of another court had to be filed by a procureur registered at that court, in practice often another lawyer exercising both functions. Questions were raised on the necessity of the separation, given the fact that its main purpose – the preservation of the quality of the legal profession and observance of local court rules and customs – had become obsolete. For that reason, the procureur as a separate profession was abolished and its functions merged with the legal profession in 2008. Currently, lawyers can file cases before any court, regardless of where they are registered. The only notable exception concerns civil cases brought before the Supreme Court, which have to be handled by lawyers registered at the Supreme Court, thus gaining from it the title "lawyer at the Supreme Court".

New Zealand
In New Zealand, the professions are not formally fused but practitioners are enrolled in the High Court as "Barristers and Solicitors". They may choose, however, to practise as barristers sole. About 15% practise solely as barristers, mainly in the larger cities and usually in "chambers" (following the British terminology). They receive "instructions" from other practitioners, at least nominally. They usually conduct the proceedings in their entirety.

Any lawyer may apply to become a King's Counsel (KC) to recognize the long-standing contribution to the legal profession but this status is only conferred on those practising as solicitors in exceptional circumstances. This step referred to as "being called to the inner bar" or "taking silk", is considered highly prestigious and has been a step in the career of many New Zealand judges.

Unlike other jurisdictions, the term "junior barrister" is popularly used to refer to a lawyer who holds a practising certificate as a barrister, but is employed by another, more senior barrister. Generally, junior barristers are within their first five years of practise and are not yet qualified to practise as barristers sole. Barristers sole (i.e. barristers who are not employed by another barrister) who are not King's Counsel are never referred to as junior barristers.

Nigeria
In Nigeria, there is no formal distinction between barristers and solicitors. All students who pass the bar examinations – offered exclusively by the Nigerian Law School – are called to the Nigerian bar, by the Body of Benchers. Lawyers may argue in any Federal trial or appellate court as well as any of the courts in Nigeria's 36 states and the Federal Capital Territory. The Legal Practitioner's Act refers to Nigerian lawyers as Legal Practitioners, and following their call to the Bar, Nigerian lawyers enter their names in the register or Roll of Legal Practitioners kept at the Supreme Court. Perhaps, for this reason, a Nigerian lawyer is also often referred to as a Barrister and Solicitor of the Supreme Court of Nigeria, and many Nigerian lawyers term themselves Barrister-at-Law complete with the postnominal initials "B.L.".

The vast majority of Nigerian lawyers combine contentious and non-contentious work, although there is a growing tendency for practitioners in the bigger practices to specialise in one or the other. In colloquial parlance within the Nigerian legal profession, lawyers may, for this reason, be referred to as "litigators" or as "solicitors".

Consistent with the practice in England and elsewhere in the Commonwealth, senior members of the profession may be selected for elevation to the Inner Bar by the conferment of the rank of Senior Advocate of Nigeria (SAN).

Pakistan

The profession in Pakistan is fused; an advocate works both as a barrister and a solicitor, with higher rights of audience being provided. To practice as a barrister in Pakistan, a law graduate must complete three steps: pass the Bar Practice and Training Course (BPTC), be called to the Bar by an Inn of Court, and attain a licence to practice as an advocate in the [courts of Pakistan from the relevant Bar Council, provincial or federal.

Poland
In Poland, there are two main types of legal professions: advocate and legal counsel. Both are regulated and these professions are restricted only for people who graduated five-year law studies, have at least three years of experience and passed five difficult national exams (civil law, criminal law, company law, administrative law and ethic) or have a doctor of law degree. Before 2015, the only difference was that advocates have a right to represent clients before the court in all cases and the legal advisors could not represent clients before the court in criminal cases. Presently, the legal advisors can also represent clients in criminal cases so currently, the differences between this professions are only historical significance.

South Africa

In South Africa the employment and practise of advocates (as barristers are known in South Africa) is consistent with the rest of the Commonwealth. Advocates carry the rank of Junior or Senior Counsel (SC), and are mostly briefed and paid by solicitors (known as attorneys). They are usually employed in the higher courts, particularly in the Appeal Courts where they often appear as specialist counsel. South African solicitors (attorneys) follow a practice of referring cases to Counsel for an opinion before proceeding with a case, when Counsel in question practises as a specialist in the case law at stake. Aspiring advocates currently spend one year in pupillage (formerly only six months) before being admitted to the bar in their respective provincial or judicial jurisdictions. The term "Advocate" is sometimes used in South Africa as a title, e. g. "Advocate John Doe, SC" (Advokaat in Afrikaans) in the same fashion as "Dr. John Doe" for a medical doctor.

South Korea
In South Korea, there is no distinction between the judiciary and lawyers. Previously, a person who has passed the national bar exam after two years of national education is able to become a judge, prosecutor, or "lawyer" in accordance to their grades upon graduation. As a result of changes from implementing an accommodated law school system, there are two standard means of becoming a lawyer. Under the current legal system, to be a judge or a prosecutor, lawyers need to practise their legal knowledge. A "lawyer" does not have any limitation of practice.

Spain
Spain has a division but it does not correspond to the division in Britain between barristers/advocates and solicitors. Procuradores represent the litigant procedurally in court, generally under the authority of a power of attorney executed by a civil law notary, while abogados represent the substantive claims of the litigant through trial advocacy. Abogados perform both transactional work and advise in connection with court proceedings, and they have full right of audience in front of the court. The court proceeding is carried out with abogados, not with procuradores. In a nutshell, procuradores are court agents that operate under the instructions of an abogado. Their practice is confined to the locality of the court to which they are admitted.

United Kingdom
Under EU law, barristers, along with advocates, chartered legal executives and solicitors, are recognised as lawyers.

England and Wales

Although with somewhat different laws, England and Wales are considered within the United Kingdom a single united and unified legal jurisdiction for the purposes of both civil and criminal law, alongside Scotland and Northern Ireland, the other two legal jurisdictions within the United Kingdom. England and Wales are covered by a common bar (an organisation of barristers) and a single law society (an organisation of solicitors).

The profession of barrister in England and Wales is a separate profession from that of solicitor. It is, however, possible to hold the qualification of both barrister and solicitor, and/or chartered legal executive at the same time. It is not necessary to leave the bar to qualify as a solicitor.

Barristers are regulated by the Bar Standards Board, a division of the General Council of the Bar. A barrister must be a member of one of the Inns of Court, which traditionally educated and regulated barristers. There are four Inns of Court: The Honourable Society of Lincoln's Inn, The Honourable Society of Gray's Inn, The Honourable Society of the Middle Temple, and The Honourable Society of the Inner Temple. All are situated in central London, near the Royal Courts of Justice. They perform scholastic and social roles, and in all cases, provide financial aid to student barristers (subject to merit) through scholarships. It is the Inns that actually "call" the student to the Bar at a ceremony similar to a graduation. Social functions include dining with other members and guests and hosting other events.

Law graduates wishing to work and be known as barristers must take a course of professional training (known as the "vocational component") at one of the institutions approved by the Bar Council. Until late 2020 this course was exclusively the Bar Professional Training Course, but since then the approved training offer was broadened to would-be barristers via a number of different courses, such as the new Bar Vocational Course at the Inns of Court College of Advocacy. On successful completion of the vocational component, student barristers are "called" to the bar by their respective inns and are elevated to the degree of "Barrister". However, before they can practise independently they must first undertake 12 months of pupillage. The first six months of this period are spent shadowing more senior practitioners, after which pupil barristers may begin to undertake some court work of their own. Following successful completion of this stage, most barristers then join a set of Chambers, a group of counsel who share the costs of premises and support staff whilst remaining individually self-employed.

In December 2014 there were just over 15,500 barristers in independent practice, of whom about ten percent are King's Counsel and the remainder are junior barristers. Many barristers (about 2,800) are employed in companies as "in-house" counsel, or by local or national government or in academic institutions.

Certain barristers in England and Wales are now instructed directly by members of the public. Members of the public may engage the services of the barrister directly within the framework of the Public Access Scheme; a solicitor is not involved at any stage. Barristers undertaking public access work can provide legal advice and representation in court in almost all areas of law (see the Public Access Information on the Bar Council website) and are entitled to represent clients in any court or tribunal in England and Wales. Once instructions from a client are accepted, it is the barrister (rather than the solicitor) who advises and guides the client through the relevant legal procedure or litigation.

Before a barrister can undertake Public Access work, they must have completed a special course. At present, about one in 20 barristers has so qualified. There is also a separate scheme called "Licensed Access", available to certain nominated classes of professional client; it is not open to the general public. Public access work is experiencing a huge surge at the bar, with barristers taking advantage of the new opportunity for the bar to make profit in the face of legal aid cuts elsewhere in the profession.

The ability of barristers to accept such instructions is a recent development; it results from a change in the rules set down by the General Council of the Bar in July 2004. The Public Access Scheme has been introduced as part of the drive to open up the legal system to the public and to make it easier and cheaper to obtain access to legal advice. It further reduces the distinction between solicitors and barristers. The distinction remains however because there are certain aspects of a solicitor's role that a barrister is not able to undertake.

Historically a barrister might use the honorific, Esquire. Even though the term barrister-at-law is sometimes seen, and was once very common, it has never been formally correct in England and Wales. Barrister is the only correct nomenclature.

Barristers are expected to maintain very high standards of professional conduct. The objective of the barristers code of conduct is to avoid dominance by either the barrister or the client and the client being enabled to make informed decisions in a supportive atmosphere  and, in turn, the client expects (implicitly and/or explicitly) the barrister to uphold their duties, namely by acting in the client's best interests (CD2), acting with honesty and integrity (CD3), keeping the client's affairs confidential (CD6) and working to a competent standard (CD7). These core duties (CDs) are a few, among others, that are enshrined in the BSB Handbook.

Northern Ireland

In April 2003 there were 554 barristers in independent practice in Northern Ireland. 66 were King's Counsel (KCs), barristers who have earned a high reputation and are appointed by the Queen on the recommendation of the Lord Chancellor as senior advocates and advisers.

Those barristers who are not KCs are called Junior Counsel and are styled "BL" or "Barrister-at-Law". The term junior is often misleading since many members of the Junior Bar are experienced barristers with considerable expertise.

Benchers are, and have been for centuries, the governing bodies of the four Inns of Court in London and King's Inns, Dublin. The Benchers of the Inn of Court of Northern Ireland governed the Inn until the enactment of the Constitution of the Inn in 1983, which provides that the government of the Inn is shared between the Benchers, the Executive Council of the Inn and members of the Inn assembled in General Meeting.

The Executive Council (through its Education Committee) is responsible for considering Memorials submitted by applicants for admission as students of the Inn and by Bar students of the Inn for admission to the degree of Barrister-at-Law and making recommendations to the Benchers. The final decisions on these Memorials are taken by the Benchers. The Benchers also have the exclusive power of expelling or suspending a Bar student and of disbarring a barrister or suspending a barrister from practice.

The Executive Council is also involved with: education; fees of students; calling counsel to the Bar, although call to the Bar is performed by the Lord Chief Justice of Northern Ireland on the invitation of the Benchers; administration of the Bar Library (to which all practising members of the Bar belong); and liaising with corresponding bodies in other countries.

Scotland

In Scotland, an advocate is, in all respects except name, a barrister, but there are significant differences in professional practice.

In Scotland, admission to and the conduct of the profession is regulated by the Faculty of Advocates (as opposed to an Inn).

Crown dependencies and UK Overseas Territories

Isle of Man, Jersey and Guernsey
In the Bailiwick of Jersey, there are solicitors (called ecrivains) and advocates (French avocat). In the Bailiwicks of Jersey and Guernsey and on the Isle of Man, Advocates perform the combined functions of both solicitors and barristers.

Gibraltar
Gibraltar is a British Overseas Territory boasting a legal profession based on the common law. The legal profession includes both barristers and solicitors with most barristers also acting as solicitors. Admission and Disciplinary matters in Gibraltar are dealt with by the Bar Council of Gibraltar and the Supreme Court of Gibraltar. In order for barristers or solicitors to be admitted as practising lawyers in Gibraltar they must comply with the Supreme Court Act 1930 as amended by the Supreme Court Amendment Act 2015 which requires, amongst other things, for all newly admitted lawyers as of 1 July 2015 to undertake a year's course in Gibraltar law at the University of Gibraltar. Solicitors also have right of audience in Gibraltar's courts.

United States
The United States does not distinguish between lawyers as pleaders (barristers) and agents (or solicitors). Any American lawyer who has passed a bar examination and has been admitted to practice law in a particular U.S. state or other jurisdiction may prosecute or defend in the courts of that jurisdiction. The barrister–solicitor distinction existed historically in some U.S. states, which had a separate label for barristers (called "counselors", hence the expression "attorney and counselor at law"). But both professions have long since been fused into the all-purpose "lawyer" or "attorney".

Additionally, some state appellate courts require attorneys to obtain a separate certificate of admission to plead and practice in the appellate court. Federal courts require specific admission to that court's bar to practice before it. At the state appellate level and in federal courts, there is generally no separate examination process, although some U.S. district courts require an examination on practices and procedures in their specific courts. Unless an examination is required, admission is usually granted as a matter of course to any licensed attorney in the state where the court is located. Some federal courts will grant admission to any attorney licensed in any U.S. jurisdiction.

Popular culture
 Rumpole of the Bailey (UK) – classic courtroom series
 Kavanagh Q.C. (1995–2001) (UK)
 North Square (2000) (UK) – Channel 4 court drama series contains interactions between barristers and solicitors
 Bridget Jones's Diary (1996 book and 2001 film) – A major character, Mark Darcy, is described as a "top barrister"
 A Fish Called Wanda (1988) – John Cleese's character, Archie Leach, is a barrister who, in defending a hapless jewel thief, becomes entangled in the crime
 Silk (2011–2014) (UK) – BBC court drama series
 Rake (2010–2016) – Australian TV series based on the story of a colourful barrister
 Sydney Carton – central character, a barrister, in Charles Dickens' A Tale of Two Cities
 Witness for the Prosecution, in which the central character is the barrister Sir Wilfred Robards, QC
 Arnold Timsh – Target in The Knife of Dunwall, an expansion on the video game Dishonored
Barrister Babu (2020) – Indian social drama TV series on Colors TV

See also
 Bar (law)
 Barristers' Ball
 Legal professions in England and Wales
 Revising Barrister
 Serjeant-at-law
 Special Pleader

References

Further reading
 Abel, Richard L. The Making of the English Legal Profession: 1800-1988 (1998), 576pp 
 Lemmings, David. Gentlemen and Barristers: The Inns of Court and the English Bar, 1680-1730 (Oxford 1990)
 Levack, Brian. The civil lawyers (Oxford 1973)
 Prest, Wilfrid. The Inns of Court (1972)
 Prest, Wilfrid. The Rise of the Barristers (1986)

External links

 Hong Kong Bar Association (barristers in Hong Kong)
 
 Canadian Bar Association

Australia
 Australian Bar Association (barristers in the Commonwealth of Australia)
 New South Wales Bar Association
 The Victorian Bar (Australia)
 Queensland Bar Association (Australia)
 South Australian Bar Association (Australia)
 Western Australian Bar Association (Australia)
 The Northern Territory Bar Association (Australia)

UK and Ireland
 The Barrister magazine
 The Inner Temple
 Bar Council (barristers in England and Wales)
 Bar Library of Northern Ireland 
 Faculty of Advocates in Scotland
 The Bar of Ireland
 The difference between barristers and solicitors 
 
 Advice on structure and training for the Bar
 

Common law
Law of the United Kingdom
Legal professions